is a Japanese businessman from Kobe. He graduated from Keio University in 1957.
 
He was the former CEO of Mitsui O.S.K. Lines, and served as the president of the Japan Postal Agency 2003 to March 2007. He was named the honorary consul to the Republic of Mauritius in 2002, and he is a member of the Trilateral Commission. since 1998 he served as an independent non-executive director of Dah Sing Financial Holdings Ltd.

References

1935 births
Japan Post Holdings
Japanese chief executives
Keio University alumni
Living people
People from Kobe